James W. Sanfey (died 3 April 2000) was an Irish Fine Gael politician and Army Commandant. He was a member of Seanad Éireann from 1973 to 1977. He was nominated by the Taoiseach to the 13th Seanad in 1973. He did not contest the 1977 Seanad election.

He attended Synge Street CBS.

References

Year of birth missing
2000 deaths
Fine Gael senators
Members of the 13th Seanad
Nominated members of Seanad Éireann